Crouania willae is a marine red algal species  endemic to New Zealand. It was first described in 1986 by Richard Earl Norris.

Etymology 
The species epithet, willae, honours Eileen Alice Willa who collected the type specimen (a female plant - CHR 39950) at Ringaringa, on Stewart Island on 24 January 1960 having found it growing on Cystophora.

References

External links 

 Museum of New Zealand Te Papa Tongarewa: Crouania willae R.E.Norris (Species)

Flora of New Zealand
Ceramiales